Ernesto J. Rotunno (unknown – unknown) was a Uruguayan chess player, two-time Uruguayan Chess Championship winner (1938, 1939).

Biography
In the end of 1930s Ernesto Rotunno was one of Uruguayan leading chess players. He twice in row won Uruguayan Chess Championships in 1938 and 1939, and participated in Montevideo 1938 chess tournament which happened as South American Chess Championship (tournament won World Chess Champion Alexander Alekhine). 

Ernesto Rotunno played for Uruguay in the Chess Olympiad:
 In 1939, at first board in the 8th Chess Olympiad in Buenos Aires (+3, =5, -4).

In 1954, Ernesto Rotunno participated in the match against the Soviet Union as a member of the Uruguayan national team.

References

External links

Ernesto Rotunno chess games at 365chess.com

Year of birth missing
Year of death missing
Uruguayan chess players
Chess Olympiad competitors
20th-century chess players